Dichromochlamys is a genus of Australian flowering plants in the family Asteraceae.

There is only one known species, Dichromochlamys dentatifolia, endemic to Australia (New South Wales, Queensland, Northern Territory, South Australia, Western Australia).

References

External links
Planenet New South Wales Flora Online

Monotypic Asteraceae genera
Astereae
Endemic flora of Australia